Tetropini is a tribe of longhorn beetles of the subfamily Lamiinae.

Genera
 Tetrops
 Lenotetrops

References

 
Lamiinae